Nevada School District 1 is a public school district based in Nevada County, Arkansas. Based in Rosston along U.S. Highway 278, the school district encompasses  of land in the county, supports more than 400 students, and employs more than 80 educators and staff at its two schools and district offices.

In the 2013–2014 school year, the district had 362 students.

Communities in its service area include Rosston, Bodcaw, Cale, Willisville, Laneburg, and Oak Grove. A small portion of the district extends into Ouachita County.

History
The Nevada County School District formed on July 1, 1985, from the merger of Bodcaw, Cale, Laneburg, Oakgrove, and Willisville school districts.

The Arkansas Board of Education voted to dissolve the Stephens School District in April 2014, and the portion in Nevada County was given to the Nevada School District. The Stephens district asked the state board to merge all of the district into the Nevada School District as a way of keeping the Stephens School open, but the state board rejected the proposal.

Schools 
 Nevada Elementary School, serving kindergarten through grade 6.
 Nevada High School, serving grades 7 through 12.

References

Further reading
 (Download) - Includes locations of schools of predecessor districts

External links

 
 
 Nevada School District No. 1 Nevada County, Arkansas Regulatory Basis Financial Statements and Other Reports June 30, 2011
 Nevada School District No. 1 Nevada County, Arkansas Regulatory Basis Financial Statements And Other Reports June 30, 2014

Education in Nevada County, Arkansas
Education in Ouachita County, Arkansas
School districts in Arkansas
School districts established in 1985
1985 establishments in Arkansas